Hans Hjalmar "Tjalle" Mild (31 July 1934 – 23 December 2007) was a Swedish football, ice hockey and bandy player.

Career
Mild won Allsvenskan two times with Djurgårdens IF and capped 31 times for the national football team. In 1964, Mild won the Guldbollen as the best Swedish football player of the year.

As an ice hockey player Mild played for IK Göta, Djurgårdens IF, and Hammarby IF and became Swedish champion six times. He also made 63 appearances in the national icehockey team and was a part of the silver winning team in the 1964 Winter Olympics.

Honours

Club 

 Djurgårdens IF 
 Allsvenskan (2): 1959, 1964
 Division 2 Svealand (1): 1961

Individual 
 Guldbollen (1): 1964

References

External links 

Swedish ice hockey left wingers
Swedish footballers
Swedish bandy players
Sweden international footballers
1934 births
2007 deaths
Allsvenskan players
Djurgårdens IF Hockey players
Djurgårdens IF Fotboll players
Ice hockey players at the 1964 Winter Olympics
Olympic ice hockey players of Sweden
Olympic silver medalists for Sweden
Olympic medalists in ice hockey
Medalists at the 1964 Winter Olympics
IK Sirius Fotboll players
Swedish football managers
IK Göta Ishockey players
Hammarby Hockey (1921–2008) players
Eskilstuna City FK players
Eskilstuna City FK managers
Association football defenders
Ice hockey people from Stockholm
Djurgårdens IF Hockey coaches